Kshamavani or "Forgiveness Day" is a day of forgiving and seeking forgiveness for the followers of Jainism. Digambaras celebrate it on the first day of Ashvin Krishna month of the lunar-based Jain calendar. Śvētāmbaras celebrate it on Samvatsari, the last day of the annual Paryushana festival. which coincides with the Chaturthi, 4th day of Shukla Paksha in the holy month of Bhadra.  "Micchami Dukkadam" is the common phrase when asking for forgiveness. It is a Prakrit phrase meaning "May all the evil that has been done be fruitless".

Observance
On this sacred day, every member of the Jain community approaches everyone, irrespective of religion, and begs for forgiveness for all their faults or mistakes, committed either knowingly or unknowingly. Thus relieved of the heavy burden hanging over their head of the sins of yesteryears, they start life afresh, living in peaceful co-existence with others. Indeed, this day is not merely a traditional ritual, but a first step on their path to moksha (liberation) or salvation, the final goal of every man's life, according to the teachings of Jainism.

Mahavira said we should forgive our own soul first. To forgive others is a practical application of this supreme forgiveness. It is the path of spiritual purification.
Mahavira said: "The one whom you hurt or kill is you. All souls are equal and similar and have the same nature and qualities". Ahimsa Paramo Dharma. Anger begets more anger and forgiveness and love beget more forgiveness and love. Forgiveness benefits both the forgiver and the forgiven.

Forgiveness is the other name of non-violence (Ahimsa) which shows the right path of 'Live and Let Live' to one and all. Forgiveness teaches us Ahimsa (non-violence) and through ahimsa we should learn to practice forbearance.

Michchhami Dukkadam Prayer

Kshamavani Parva celebrates forgiveness as a way to a life of love, friendship, peace and harmony. When you forgive, you stop feeling resentful; there is no more indignation or anger against another for a perceived offence, difference or mistake; there is no clamour for punishment. It means the end of violence (Hinsa).

Samvatsari and Kshamavaani 
While Samvatsari and Kshamavaani are typically associated with Shwetambar sect and Digambara respectively, there is no major difference between the two days and both are observed as Forgiveness Days. Rather, the two are usually used interchangeably.

However, a major difference between the two is that despite both Samvatsari and Kshamavaani falling on the last day of Paryushan, they are in fact two different days. This is because the Paryushan festival for the two sects itself commences on different dates and is of varying duration.

As a result, while Samvatsari is observed on  Shukla Panchami of Bhadrapada month by the Shwetambars, the Digambaras celebrate Kshamavani on the first day of Ashvin Krishna month of the lunar-based Jain calendar.

See also
 Forgiveness in Jainism
 Micchami Dukkadam
 Samvatsari

References

External links
 Celebrate Forgiveness: Kshamavani Divas
  Kshamavani Parva

Jain festivals